The Lithuania men's national water polo team is the representative for Lithuania in international men's water polo.

Lithuania men's national water polo team regularly competes in annual Baltic Water Polo Championships.

References

External links 
Lithuanian Water Polo Federation

Water polo
Men's national water polo teams
National water polo teams in Europe
National water polo teams by country
 
Men's sport in Lithuania